2012 Czech Lion Awards ceremony was held on 3 February 2013.

Winners and nominees

Non-statutory Awards

References

2012 film awards
Czech Lion Awards ceremonies